Cinnamon Peak is a  mountain summit located in the northwestern part of Mount Robson Provincial Park, in the Canadian Rockies of British Columbia, Canada. It is situated immediately north of the confluence of the Robson River and the Fraser River, and is visible from the Yellowhead Highway near the park's visitor centre. The peak was labelled "Little Grizzly" on Arthur Oliver Wheeler's 1911 topographic map of Mount Robson. He thought it appeared similar to Mount Grizzly in the Selkirk Mountains, but the name was later changed to Cinnamon, which is the coloration of the peak and the Cinnamon bear, which can be easily mistaken for a grizzly bear. "Little Grizzly" is a colloquial term for the black bear, Ursus americanus. Eastern populations are typically black in color, however western populations can be cinnamon colored. The mountain's toponym was officially adopted in 1951 by the Geographical Names Board of Canada. The nearest higher peak is Whitehorn Mountain,  to the north. 


Climate

Based on the Köppen climate classification, Cinnamon Peak is located in a subarctic climate zone with cold, snowy winters, and mild summers. The months June through September usually offer the most favorable weather to view or climb the peak. Precipitation runoff from Cinnamon Peak drains into Swiftcurrent Creek and the Robson River, both of which are tributaries of the Fraser River.

See also
 List of mountains in the Canadian Rockies
 Geography of British Columbia

Gallery

References

External links

Mount Robson Provincial Park—BC Parks
 Cinnamon Peak: weather forecast

Canadian Rockies
Two-thousanders of British Columbia
Robson Valley
Mount Robson Provincial Park
Cariboo Land District